Ted Nicolaou is an American film director, screenwriter and producer.

After graduating from the University of Texas film program, he joined the crew of The Texas Chain Saw Massacre (1974) as a sound recordist. Later, he joined Charles Band's Empire Pictures, where he worked as an editor on such films as Ghoulies (1985) and eventually debuted as a director with The Dungeonmaster (1985) and TerrorVision (1986).

His most famous directorial effort is the Subspecies film series. Apart from his feature film projects, he also works in television.

Selected filmography
Don’t Let Her In (2021)
Vampire Slaughter: Eaten Alive (2018)
Bunker of Blood: Chapter 2 - Deadly Dolls: Deepest Cuts (2018)
Finding Happiness (2014)
DevilDolls (2012)
The Etruscan Mask (2007)
Aliens Gone Wild (2005)
Puppet Master vs. Demonic Toys (2004)
 (2004)
The Horrible Dr. Bones (2000)
The St. Francisville Experiment (2000)
Ragdoll (1999)
Subspecies 4: Bloodstorm (1998)
 The Shrunken City (1998)
Vampire Journals (1997)
Dragonworld (1994)
Bloodlust: Subspecies 3 (1994)
Bloodstone: Subspecies 2 (1993)
Remote (1993)
Bad Channels (1992)
Subspecies (1991)
TerrorVision (1986)
The Dungeonmaster (1985)

Writer 

Savage Island (1985) (written by – as Nicholas Beardsley)

TerrorVision (1986)

Bloodstone: Subspecies II (1993)

Bloodlust: Subspecies III (1994)

Vampire Journals (1995)

Subspecies 4: Bloodstorm (1996)

Dragonworld: The Legend Continues (1999)

Dracula the Impaler (2002)

Dali & Disney: A Date with Destino (2010)

The Cinemagician, Georges Méliès (2012)

Selected shorts 
Rookie and Police Captain (2019)

Boxer and Bookie (2019)

Johnny and Dana (2019)

Mobster Father and Son (2019)

Doctor and Patient (2019)

Lawyer and Opposing Counsel (2019)

References

External links

Living people
Year of birth missing (living people)
American film directors
Moody College of Communication alumni
American male screenwriters
American film producers
Horror film directors